The First National Bank Building at 402 Donoho St. in Jayton, Texas was built in 1912.  It was listed on the National Register of Historic Places in 1997.

It is a Classical Revival-style building with brick veneer and masonry bearing walls on a concrete foundation.
It also served as the Kent County Courthouse in 1955.

It was designed by architect Rockwell Henry Stuckey (1855-1936).

It is also a Recorded Texas Historic Landmark.

See also

National Register of Historic Places listings in Kent County, Texas
Recorded Texas Historic Landmarks in Kent County

References

External links

Courthouses in Texas
National Register of Historic Places in Kent County, Texas
Neoclassical architecture in Texas
Buildings and structures completed in 1912